RHP may refer to:

 RHP (film), Fujichrome 400 D Professional and Fujichrome Provia, a series of professional Fujifilm color reversal films with a film speed of ISO 400
 1st Parachute Hussar Regiment (French: 1er Régiment de Hussards Parachutistes  or 1er RHP), an airborne cavalry unit in the French army
 Red House Painters, an American alternative rock group
 Resource holding potential (or power), a measure of an animal's fighting ability
 Right-handed pitcher, in baseball
 Right-hand path, a term used in Western esotericism
 Right-half-plane, a concept in the Nyquist criterion used in designing feedback control systems
 Rio Hondo Preparatory School, in Arcadia, California
 Rödelheim Hartreim Projekt, a German rap group
 Rogers Home Phone, a subsidiary of Rogers Communications
 Rudimentary horn pregnancy